Land Bank of the Philippines (LBP; often referred to simply as LandBank), is a government-owned bank in the Philippines with a special focus on serving the needs of farmers and fishermen. While it provides the services of a universal bank, it is officially classified as a "specialized government bank" with a universal banking license.

LandBank is the second largest bank in the Philippines in terms of assets and is the largest government-owned bank. It is also one of the biggest government-owned and controlled corporations and banking institutions in the Philippines along with the Development Bank of the Philippines (DBP),  Overseas Filipino Bank (OFW Bank), and Al-Amanah Islamic Investment Bank of the Philippines.

Unlike most Philippine banks, LandBank has an extensive rural branch network with 409 Branches and Extension Offices, 46 Lending Centers and 2,188 ATMs (as of February 2020). It services many rural sector clients in areas where banking is either limited to rural banks or is non-existent.

History 
LandBank was established on August 8, 1963, as part of the Agricultural Land Reform Code as part of a program of land reform in the Philippines.  It was to help with the purchase of agricultural estates for division and resale to small landholders and the purchase of land by the agricultural lessee.  In 1965, LandBank's by-laws were approved and its first board of trustees was formed, with the Secretary of Finance as chairman.

On October 21, 1972, Presidential Decree No. 27, signed by President Ferdinand Marcos, emancipated all tenant farmers working on private agricultural lands devoted to rice and corn, whether working on a landed estate or not. The system was implemented through a system of sharecropping or lease-tenancy. LandBank was tasked to collect 15-year land amortizations from beneficiaries at the cost of the value of the land plus six percent interest per annum.

By 1973, LandBank was in financial distress.  It lacked the resources and the capital needed to implement the land reform programs and lacked the structure to implement the programs efficiently.  On July 21, Marcos signed Presidential Decree No. 251 which revitalized the bank.  The decree granted LandBank a universal banking license (the first bank in the Philippines to be issued such a license) with a social mission to spur countryside development.  The decree expanded LandBank's powers to include lending for agricultural, industrial, homebuilding and home-financing projects and other productive enterprises, as well as lending to farmers' cooperatives and associations to facilitate production, marketing of crops and acquisition of essential commodities. LandBank was also required by the decree to provide timely and adequate support in all phases involved in the execution of agrarian reform and also increased its authorized capital to 3 billion pesos.  It also became exempted from all national, provincial, city and municipal taxes and assessments.

LandBank was reorganized in 1977 when it was divided into three sectors to better assess the needs of its customers.  It was divided into Agrarian, Banking and Operations sectors to strengthen operations and ensure long-term viability.

In 1982, the Agricultural Credit Administration (ACA), established under the same law as LandBank, was abolished and all its assets and functions transferred to LandBank. ACA's function was to extend credit to small farmers.  Also in this year, Union Bank of the Philippines (UnionBank) was formed, with LandBank having a 40-percent stake in the government-owned commercial bank.

LandBank became the financial intermediary for the Comprehensive Agrarian Reform Program (CARP) in 1988.  It was also in that year that UnionBank started a gradual privatization.  The Aboitiz Group of Companies acquired LandBank's 40% share of UnionBank then which it continues to own. LandBank also became the third member of Expressnet, an interbank network in December 1991 but now a BancNet member.

On February 23, 1995, LandBank's charter was once again amended. Its authorized capital was increased to nine billion pesos and it became an official government depository. The number of members of the board of trustees was also increased to nine. On August 25, 1998, LandBank's authorized capital was once again increased to 25 billion pesos, and it then increased to 200 billion pesos, after the planned DBP–LandBank merger in 2016.

In 2014, LandBank was planned to be merged with the Development Bank of the Philippines (DBP). President Benigno Aquino III signed Executive Order No. 198 on February 4, 2016, to give way on the merger, with the former as the surviving entity. However, the Duterte administration canceled the merger later that year.

On June 25, 2021, President Rodrigo Duterte signed Executive Order No. 142 which mandates the merging of LandBank with the United Coconut Planters Bank (UCPB), with LandBank as the surviving entity.

Current operations

LandBank competes against the major banks such as Metrobank, Bank of the Philippine Islands (BPI), Banco de Oro and Philippine National Bank (PNB). In rural areas, it either competes against or complements rural banks.

On the other end of the spectrum, LandBank takes on a dual role with the Development Bank of the Philippines, another government-owned bank.  It either competes against or works with DBP, depending on the situation.

Board of Directors
Chairman: Finance Sec. Benjamin E. Diokno
Vice Chairman: Cecilia C. Borromeo 
Members:
President & Agriculture Sec. Bongbong Marcos
DOLE Sec. Bienvenido E. Laguesma
DAR Sec. Conrado M. Estrella III
Virgilio D.V. Robes - Representative, Agrarian Reform Beneficiaries Sector 
Jaime L. Miralles - Representative, Agrarian Reform Beneficiaries Sector 
Nancy D. Irlanda - Representative, Private Sector

Executive Management Team
Cecilia C. Borromeo - President & CEO
Liduvino S. Geron - Executive Vice President, National Development Lending Sector 
Julio D. Climaco Jr. - Executive Vice President, Branch Banking Sector 
Alan V. Bornas - Executive Vice President, Operations Sector
Carel D. Halog - Executive Vice President, Treasury and Investment Banking Sector
Alex A. Lorayes - Executive Vice President, Corporate Services Sector

Subsidiaries and affiliates 

Land Bank has the following subsidiaries and affiliates:

LBP Leasing Corporation
LBP Insurance Brokerage
LBP Resources and Development Corporation (former LB (Land Bank) Realty Development Corporation)
Masaganang Sakahan, Inc.
LBP Countryside Development Foundation, Inc.
UCPB Securities, Inc.
 Overseas Filipino Bank

See also

List of banks in the Philippines
Expressnet
BancNet

References

External links
 Land Bank website
 Largest Banks in the Philippines (2009)

Philippines
Agriculture in the Philippines
Banks of the Philippines
Government-owned and controlled corporations of the Philippines
Companies based in Manila
Banks established in 1963